Clansman, clansmen, Klansman, klansmen, or variations, may refer to:

People
 Clansman, a member of a clan
 especially, a member of a Scottish clan

Literature
 The Clansman (1905), a pro-Ku Klux Klan novel and play by Thomas F. Dixon, Jr.
 Klansmen: Guardians of Liberty, 1926 political manifesto by Alma Bridwell White
 The Clansman (1959 novel), a historical novel written by Nigel Tranter, see Historical novels by Nigel Tranter set after 1603
 The Klansman, 1965 novel by William Bradford Huie

Film
 The Birth of a Nation, 1915 American drama film also called The Clansman, by D. W. Griffith
 The Klansman, 1974 American drama film based on the 1965 novel

Other entertainment
 "The Clansman", a song by Iron Maiden from the 1998 album Virtual XI
 "Klansmen" (The Professionals), an episode of the television series

Transportation
 The Clansman, a train service between London and the Highlands, replaced by Highland Chieftain
 Clansman 30, the 30-ft Clansman class of yacht
 , a ferry launched in 1998, fifth of the name
 , a ferry launched in 1964, fourth of the name
  (1942–1965), the Empire ship Clansman, a collier

Other uses
 Clansman (military radio), a British military radio system
 Clansman Ale, a beer brewed by Hebridean Brewing Company
 SFU Clansmen, the Simon Fraser University team name

See also
 Black Klansman (disambiguation)
 Klan (disambiguation)
 Clan (disambiguation)
 Man (disambiguation)